The 1975 South American Championships in Athletics were held in Rio de Janeiro, Brazil, between 26 and 31 August.

Medal summary

Men's events

Women's events

Medal table

External links
 Men Results – GBR Athletics
 Women Results – GBR Athletics
 Medallists

S
South American Championships in Athletics
A
1975 in South American sport
International athletics competitions hosted by Brazil
1975 in Brazilian sport
Athletics in Rio de Janeiro (city)